Mynydd Mawr Hospital was a community hospital at Upper Tumble, Llanelli, Wales. It was managed by the Hywel Dda University Health Board.

History
The hospital was established as the West Wales Isolation Hospital in the 1920s. It joined the National Health Service in 1948 and it was extended in the 1970s. After services transferred to the Prince Philip Hospital in Llanelli, Mynydd Mawr Hospital closed in October 2013.

References

Defunct hospitals in Wales
Hospitals in Carmarthenshire